A tableround is a traditional academic feast known at universities in most Middle and Eastern European countries. At a tableround, tables usually are placed in the form of a U or a W, the participants drink beer and sing commercium songs. A more formal form of the tableround is the commercium. Tableround probably shares the same roots with Cantus and Sitsit.

See also
 List of dining events

Student societies in Germany
Academic meals
Eating parties